Daniel Calparsoro López-Tapia (born 11 May 1968) is a Spanish filmmaker, considered one of Spain's most adept action film directors.

Biography
Daniel Calparsoro López-Tapia was born in Barcelona on 11 May 1968, although he was raised in between Hondarribia and San Sebastián, in Gipuzkoa. He studied Political Science in Madrid simultaneously with filmmaking studies, the latter of which he further advanced in New York. From 1995 to 2000, he was married to actress and singer Najwa Nimri. He married actress Patricia Vico circa 2006.

Selected filmography
Feature films

References

External links 
 

Spanish film directors
1968 births
Living people
Action film directors